William Gordon Beecher, Jr. (January 19, 1904 in Baltimore, Maryland – December 7, 1973) was an American composer, writer and vice admiral. Many of his musical arrangements were done in cooperation with Johnny Noble.

Military career
Beecher was educated at the United States Naval Academy and at the National War College. He served 34 years in the United States Navy, retiring as a vice admiral in 1955. In World War II, Beecher commanded a destroyer squadron, and fought at Pearl Harbor, Iwo Jima, and Okinawa. He received the Legion of Merit.

Creative work
Between 1933 and 1935, Beecher directed the USNA Musical Clubs and joined the American Society of Composers, Authors and Publishers in 1944. He composed around 700 songs. Known compositions, many of which he published under the pseudonym "Gordon Beecher", are "A Song of Old Hawaii", "Sing an American Song", "Counting On You", "All Pau Now", "Nimitz, Halsey and Me", "Just a Happy Kama'aina" and "The Ramparts We Watch". He served as technical advisor for the movie Shipmates Forever produced by Warner Bros.

Beecher died in 1973 and is buried at the Arlington National Cemetery.

Awards
Legion of Merit
Commendation Ribbon awarded by the Secretary of the Navy 
Second Nicaraguan Campaign Medal
American Defense Service Medal
Fleet Clasp
Asiatic-Pacific Campaign Medal with four engagement stars
American Campaign Medal
World War II Victory Medal
Navy Occupation Service Medal
Asia Clasp
National Defense Service Medal

References

External links
 Retrieved on 2008-02-10
Detailed biography at SearchTrees.com

1904 births
1973 deaths
American male composers
United States Naval Academy alumni
Burials at Arlington National Cemetery
Recipients of the Legion of Merit
Writers from Baltimore
20th-century American composers
20th-century American writers
20th-century American male writers
20th-century American male musicians